Broadway Historic District is located in Salem, Salem County, New Jersey, United States. The district was added to the National Register of Historic Places on March 5, 1992.

See also
National Register of Historic Places listings in Salem County, New Jersey

References

Houses on the National Register of Historic Places in New Jersey
Federal architecture in New Jersey
Geography of Salem County, New Jersey
National Register of Historic Places in Salem County, New Jersey
Salem, New Jersey
Historic districts in Salem County, New Jersey
Houses in Salem County, New Jersey
Historic districts on the National Register of Historic Places in New Jersey
New Jersey Register of Historic Places